Ibrahima Sissoko (born 27 October 1997) is a French professional footballer who plays as a midfielder for French club Strasbourg.

Personal life
Sissoko is of Malian descent.

References

External links

 

1997 births
Living people
People from Meaux
French footballers
France youth international footballers
French people of Malian descent
CS Meaux players
US Torcy players
Stade Brestois 29 players
RC Strasbourg Alsace players
Ligue 1 players
Ligue 2 players
Association football midfielders
Footballers from Seine-et-Marne